Miloš Mirković (born 17 July 1983) is a Bosnian former professional basketball player.

Professional career 
A power forward and center, Mirković played for Krka, Crvena zvezda, Elektra Šoštanj, Ergonom, Air Avellino, Debreceni, ČEZ Nymburk, and Igokea. He retired as a player in 2009 at age 26 due to injuries.

National team career 
Mirković was a member of the Bosnia and Herzegovina national team at the 2005 Mediterranean Games in Almería, Spain.

Career achievements
 Czech National League champion: 2  (with ČEZ Nymburk: 2006–07)
 Serbia and Montenegro Cup winner: 1  (with Crvena zvezda: 2003–04)
 Czech Republic Cup winner: 1  (with ČEZ Nymburk: 2006–07)

References

External links
 Milos Mirkovic at eurobasket.com
 Milos Mirkovic at realgm.com
 Milos Mirkovic at proballers.com
 Milos Mirkovic at euroleague.net
 Milos Mirkovic at aba-liga.com

1983 births
Living people
ABA League players
Basketball Nymburk players
Bosnia and Herzegovina expatriate basketball people in Serbia
Bosnia and Herzegovina men's basketball players
Centers (basketball)
Competitors at the 2005 Mediterranean Games
KK Crvena zvezda players
KK Ergonom players
KK Igokea players
KK Krka players
Power forwards (basketball)
Serbs of Bosnia and Herzegovina
Slovenian expatriate basketball people in Italy
Slovenian expatriate basketball people in Serbia
Slovenian men's basketball players
Slovenian people of Bosnia and Herzegovina descent
Slovenian people of Serbian descent
Sportspeople from Tuzla
S.S. Felice Scandone players